Gerald Mast (May 13, 1940 – September 1, 1988) was an author, film historian, and member of the University of Chicago faculty. He was a contributor to the modern discipline of film studies and film history.

Life and career
Mast was born in Los Angeles in 1940; his family included his mother, Bessie, and Linda, his sister. He attended the University of Chicago, where he received his bachelor's, master's, and doctoral degrees in English. He taught at New York University, Oberlin College, and the City University of New York, before joining the faculty of his alma mater in 1978. He chaired the Department of English Language and Literature, and his donation of 300 film prints established the university's Film Study Center and Film Archive. The university press published several of his books on the history and critical analysis of film.

His works were influential in the development of the academic study of film history, including the application of the Chicago School of literary criticism to film analysis, and several of his books, including A Short History of the Movies and Film Theory and Criticism, have been widely incorporated into university film studies programs.

Death and legacy
On September 1, 1988, Mast, age 48, died at Bernard Mitchell Hospital from complications of AIDS. At a time when public figures in the arts often remained unwilling to be associated with the disease, Mast requested that his obituaries include his cause of death. In a retrospective in Cinema Journal, Tag Gallagher compared him to French film critic Jean Mitry, and described him as America's "film-scholar laureate".

Selected works
A Short History of the Movies (1971)
The Comic Mind: Comedy and the Movies (1973)
Film Theory and Criticism: Introductory Readings (1974)
Film/Cinema/Movie: A Theory of Experience (1977)
The Movies in Our Midst: Documents in the Cultural History of Film in America (1982)
Howard Hawks, Storyteller (1982)
Can't Help Singin': The American Musical on Stage and Screen (1987)
''Bringing Up Baby: Howard Hawks Director" ed. (1989)

References

American film historians
American male non-fiction writers
Film theorists
University of Chicago alumni
University of Chicago faculty
1940 births
1988 deaths
AIDS-related deaths in Illinois
New York University faculty
Oberlin College faculty
City University of New York faculty
20th-century American historians